The scarlet-headed blackbird (Amblyramphus holosericeus) is an icterid found in the South American   wetlands.

Description
This species is about 24 cm long.  The bill is oddly shaped: long, slender, and very sharp, looking almost upturned.  Adults of both sexes are described by their name. Juveniles have entirely black plumage; orange-red feathers first appear on their breast and throat, later spreading to the neck, head, and thighs.  The song is given as "loud, clear, and melodic, a ringing 'cleer-cleer-clur, clulululu'."  Calls are simpler but have a similar quality.

Scarlet-headed blackbirds occur in pairs in large reed beds in Argentina, Paraguay, Uruguay and southern Brazil; Bolivia has an isolated population living at an altitudes of about 600 m.  They often perch conspicuously on top of stems.  They are uncommon, particularly away from the coast.

They eat mainly fruit, supplementing it with seeds and invertebrates, especially insects.  They use their bill as a hammer to open food items.

Scarlet-headed blackbirds are monogamous, and territories are grouped together.  The nest is an open cup placed in the crotch of a shrub or woven into vegetation, in which they lay two eggs.

Gallery

References

External links
 
 
Scarlet-headed blackbird videos - Internet Bird Collection
Stamps (for Argentina, Uruguay) with range map
Scarlet-headed blackbird photo gallery - VIREO
Scarlet-headed blackbird photos (Brazil)
Scarlet-headed blackbird - Neotropical Birds

scarlet-headed blackbird
scarlet-headed blackbird
Birds of Argentina
Birds of Brazil
Birds of Bolivia
Birds of Paraguay
Birds of Uruguay
Birds of the Pantanal
scarlet-headed blackbird